The Embassy of France to Moldova is located in Chișinău.

Ambassadors

See also 
 France–Moldova relations

References

External links 
  Ambassade de France en Moldavie
  Ministère français des Affaires étrangères

France
Chișinău
France–Moldova relations
Buildings and structures in Chișinău